Adrian Foster may refer to:

Adrian Foster (footballer) (born 1971), English footballer
Adrian Foster (ice hockey) (born 1982), American ice hockey player
Adrian Foster (politician), Canadian politician